Schöppingen is a municipality in the district of Borken in the state of North Rhine-Westphalia, Germany.

The Master of the Schöppingen Altarpiece derives his name from an altarpiece that hangs in the town parish church.

Gallery

Personalities 

 Heinrich von Ahaus (c. 1371-1439), promoter of the movement of the brothers and sisters of common life
 Heinrich Krechting (1501-1580), radical leader of the Baptist movement

References

Borken (district)